The 2019 City of Bradford Metropolitan District Council Election took place on 2 May 2019 to elect members of Bradford Metropolitan District Council in England.

Results summary

Ward results

Baildon

Bingley

Bingley Rural

Bolton and Undercliffe

Bowling and Barkerend

Bradford Moor

City

Clayton and Fairweather Green

Craven

Eccleshill

Great Horton

Heaton

Idle and Thackley

Ilkley

Keighley Central

Keighley East

Keighley West

Little Horton

Manningham

Queensbury

Royds

Shipley

Thornton and Allerton

Toller

Tong

Wharfedale

Wibsey

Windhill and Wrose

Worth Valley

Wyke

References

2019 English local elections
2019
2010s in West Yorkshire